Diego Varela Pampín (born 15 March 2000) is a Spanish footballer who plays as a left back for FC Andorra.

Club career
Born in Oleiros, A Coruña, Galicia, Pampín joined RC Celta de Vigo's youth sides in 2014, after representing Victoria CF and Ural CF. He made his senior debut with the reserves at the age of just 17 on 20 August 2017, starting in a 2–1 Segunda División B home win over Pontevedra CF.

Pampín scored his first senior goal on 27 October 2018, netting the opener for the B's in a 1–1 away draw against Unionistas de Salamanca CF. A regular starter for the B-team in the following seasons, he left on 1 July after his contract expired.

On 8 July 2022, free agent Pampín signed a two-year deal with Segunda División newcomers FC Andorra. He made his professional debut on 29 August, coming on as a second-half substitute for Martí Vilà in a 2–0 away loss against UD Las Palmas.

References

External links

2000 births
Living people
Sportspeople from the Province of A Coruña
Spanish footballers
Footballers from Galicia (Spain)
Association football defenders
Segunda División players
Primera Federación players
Segunda División B players
Celta de Vigo B players
FC Andorra players
Spain youth international footballers
Spanish expatriate footballers
Expatriate footballers in Andorra
Spanish expatriate sportspeople in Andorra